The Bog Walk to Port Antonio railway was a railway in Jamaica built to serve the banana, cacao, citrus and coconut districts of St Catherine, St Mary and Portland.

Construction, operation and closure
The railway operated from 1896 to 1978. It was temporarily closed from 1975 to 1977.

Gradients

Stations and Halts
There were 13 stations and 15 halts:

Tunnels

There were 17 tunnels:

Bridges
There were ten significant bridges. Approximate bridge lengths are shown in the route diagram to the right.

 B2 & River Doro at Darling Spring/Troja
 Orange River at Richmond
 Wagwater River
 Pencar River
 Dry River
 White River
 Buff Bay River
 Spanish River
 Swift River
 Rio Grande

Bibliography

See also
 Railways of Jamaica

Notes and references

Railway lines opened in 1896
Standard gauge railways in Jamaica